Blaževica (also Blaževič or Spodnja Blaževica) is a former settlement in the Municipality of Dolenjske Toplice in southern Slovenia. The area is part of the traditional region of Lower Carniola and is now included in the Southeast Slovenia Statistical Region. Its territory is now part of the village of Verdun pri Uršnih Selih.

History
Blaževica was a Gottschee German village. In 1931 it had six houses and 25 residents. The original inhabitants were expelled in the fall of 1941. The village was burned by Italian troops in the summer of 1942 during the Rog Offensive and was never rebuilt.

References

External links
 Blaževica on Geopedia
 Pre–World War II list of oeconyms and family names in Blaževica

Former populated places in the Municipality of Dolenjske Toplice